was a Japanese voice actor employed by the talent management firm Arts Vision.

Anime

TV
Argento Soma (xxxx) (Smith)
Brave Police J-Decker (1994) (Kazuto Azuma)
Dragon Drive (xxxx) (Guankū)
Fushigiboshi no Futagohime Gyu! (xxxx) (Kureson)
Kimi ga Nozomu Eien (xxxx) (Kenzō Sakiyama)
Kinnikuman: Scramble for the Throne (1991-1992) (King the 100 Ton, Buffaloman (First), Robin Knight)
Mobile Fighter G Gundam (xxxx) (Raymond Bishop)
Naruto (xxxx) (Wagarashi 96)
Planetes (xxxx) (Chad)
Fist of the North Star (1984) (Gyuki)
Transformers: The Headmasters (1987) (Getsei, Snapdragon)
Power Stone (1999) (Kraken)
Romeo × Juliet (2007) (The Old Man)
March Comes in like a Lion (2016) (Shōichi Matsunaga)
Legend of the Galactic Heroes: Die Neue These (2018) (Klaus von Lichtenlade)

OVA
Dragonslayer Eiyū Densetsu: Ōji no Tabidachi (xxxx) (Zagī)

Movies
The Dagger of Kamui (xxxx) (Gold Gan)

Games
Eberouge 2 (Zakusen Sōsuringu)
Magical Drop II (Black Pierrot)
Mega Man X4 (Storm Owl, Frost Walrus)
Tales of the Abyss (Mayor Teodoro)

Tokusatsu
Denji Sentai Megaranger (Cicada Nejire)
Kyuukyuu Sentai GoGo-V (Deathmine)

Dubbing
Kickboxer (Tong Po (Michel Qissi))

References

External links
 Arts Vision

1948 births
2021 deaths
Japanese male voice actors
Male voice actors from Saitama Prefecture
20th-century Japanese male actors
21st-century Japanese male actors
Arts Vision voice actors